The Chinatown–International District of Seattle, Washington (also known as the CID) is the center of Seattle's Asian American community. Within the Chinatown International District are the three neighborhoods known as Seattle's Chinatown, Japantown and Little Saigon, named for the concentration of businesses owned by people of Chinese, Japanese and Vietnamese descent, respectively. The geographic area also once included Seattle's Manilatown. The name Chinatown/International District was established by City Ordinance 119297 in 1999 as a result of the three neighborhoods' work and consensus on the Seattle Chinatown International District Urban Village Strategic Plan submitted to the City Council in December 1998. Like many other areas of Seattle, the neighborhood is multiethnic, but the majority of its residents are of Chinese ethnicity. It is one of eight historic neighborhoods recognized by the City of Seattle. CID has a mix of residences and businesses and is a tourist attraction for its ethnic Asian businesses and landmarks.

Location

The CID boundaries are defined as 4th Avenue South (on the west) to Rainier Avenue (on the east) and from Yesler Way (north) to Charles Street/Dearborn (south). The CID is bordered by the neighborhoods of Pioneer Square and SoDo to the west of 4th Ave S; Rainier Valley on the east side of Rainier; Beacon Hill and the Industrial District to the south of Charles/Dearborn; and Downtown and First Hill to the north of Yesler.

Within the CID are three distinct neighborhoods: Chinatown, Japantown, and Little Saigon. The Seattle Chinatown Historic District, so designated by the U.S. National Register of Historic Places in 1986, is roughly south of Jackson and west of I-5, with Hing Hay Park at its heart. In the present day, Japantown is centered on 6th Avenue and Main Street and Little Saigon's main nexus is 12th Avenue South and South Jackson Street.

Public transit
The CID is served by the International District/Chinatown station on the Central Link light rail system (via the Downtown Seattle Transit Tunnel near 4th Ave S), and three stops along Jackson on the First Hill Streetcar: at 5th Ave S (connecting to Central Link), 7th Ave S, and 12th Ave S.

History

19th century
Chinese immigrants first came to the Pacific Northwest in the 1850s, and by the 1860s, some had settled in Seattle. Many of the first Chinese immigrants to Washington came from Guangdong province, especially Taishan. The first Chinese quarters were near Yesler's Mill on the waterfront.  According to Chinese oral history, the waterfront was the first Chinatown, where the Chinese dock workers lived. The influx of Chinese immigrants was slowed by the Chinese Exclusion Act of 1882. In 1886 whites drove out most of Seattle's Chinese population. However, some took shelter with Native Americans on the reservations while others came under the protection of white employers and a judge.

The Great Seattle Fire of 1889 further hindered the community.  Eventually, the Chinese re-established new quarters farther inland, along Washington St. and Second Avenue South. This was the second Chinatown. Land values rose, especially with impending construction of the Smith Tower, and the people of Chinatown moved again, to the present and third location along King Street. Only the Hop Sing Tong managed to retain its building on 2nd and Washington. It sold this building about 2006 in order to purchase the former China Gate building at 516 7th Ave S in the current Chinatown.

Near the end of the 19th century, Japanese immigrants also began arriving, settling on the south side of the district on the other side of the railroad tracks. Part of present-day Dearborn Street, between 8th and 12th avenues, was known as Mikado Street, after the Japanese word for "emperor."  Japanese Americans developed Nihonmachi, or Japantown, on Main Street, two blocks north of King Street.  By the mid-1920s, Nihonmachi extended from 4th Avenue along Main to 7th Avenue, with clusters of businesses along Jackson, King, Weller, Lane, and Dearborn streets.

20th century
The Jackson Regrade began in 1907; workers leveled hills and used the resulting fill to reclaim tidal flats, making travel to downtown easier. As downtown property values rose, the Chinese were forced to other areas. By the early 1900s, a new Chinatown began to develop along King Street. In 1910, Goon Dip, a prominent businessman in Seattle's Chinese American community, led a group of Chinese Americans to form the Kong Yick Investment Company, a benefit society.  Their funding and efforts led to the construction of two buildings—the East Kong Yick Building and the West Kong Yick Building.

Meanwhile, Filipino Americans began arriving to replace the Chinese dock workers, who had moved inland. According to Pamana I, a history of Filipino Americans in Seattle, they settled along First Hill and the hotels and boarding houses of Chinatown and Japantown beginning in the early 1920s. They were attracted to work as contract laborers in agriculture and salmon canneries. Among them was Filipino author Carlos Bulosan, who wrote of his experiences and those of his countrymen in his novel America Is In The Heart (1946). By the 1930s, a 'Manilatown' had been established near the corner of Maynard and King.

In 1942, under the auspices of Executive Order 9066, the federal government forcibly removed and detained people of Japanese ancestry from Seattle and the West Coast in the wake of the attack on Pearl Harbor. Authorities moved them to inland internment camps, where they lived from 1942 to 1946. Most of Seattle's Japanese residents were sent to Minidoka in Idaho.  After the war, many returned to the Pacific Northwest but relocated to the suburbs or other districts in Seattle.  A remaining vestige of the old community is the office of the North American Post, a Japanese-language newspaper founded in 1902. Another is the Panama Hotel, which was proclaimed a National Treasure in 2015 with a prior listing on the U.S. National Register of Historic Places. Maneki, one of the oldest Japanese restaurants in the United States, reopened in its storage space after its original building was looted and vandalized during the war. Uwajimaya, originally a Japantown store, moved down the hill into Chinatown.

African Americans moved to Seattle in the Great Migration, mostly out of the South, to work in the war industry during World War II, occupying many of the houses left vacant by the internment of the Japanese Americans. They filled the empty businesses along Jackson Street with notable jazz clubs.

In 1951, Seattle Mayor William D. Devin proclaimed the area "International Center" because of the diversity of people who resided and worked in the vicinity. Businesswoman and later city councilwoman Ruby Chow and others criticized the use of "international" for masking Chinese American history. The use of "International District" by the city remains controversial.

Seattle's first neighborhood advocacy group, the Jackson Street Community Council, opposed the construction of an interstate highway through the area. Despite protest, many Chinese and Japanese buildings and businesses were destroyed for the construction of Interstate 5 in the 1960s. Ethnic Asians formed new civic organizations (as compared to the traditional Chinese family associations, tongs and social clubs) serve needs ranging from community health, care of the elderly, information and referrals, counseling, historic preservation, marketing of the area, and building low-income housing. The construction of the Kingdome in 1972 further boxed in the neighborhood, leading to renewed protests over the community's lack of representation, including an impromptu demonstration at the stadium's groundbreaking ceremony on November 2, 1972.

With the fall of Saigon in 1975, a new wave of immigrants from Vietnam and Southeast Asia established Seattle's Little Saigon east of I-5. Many of these immigrants were of Chinese descent. Vietnamese pho was introduced to the city in 1982 with the opening of Phở Bắc, a restaurant most famous for its boat-like shape. Meanwhile, Little Saigon gained its first grocery store with the opening of Viet Wah in 1981; it was joined by Lam's Seafood Market in 1991 and Hau Hau Market in 1995.

The worst mass murder in the history of Seattle took place at the Wah Mee Club on Maynard Alley on February 18, 1983. Thirteen people were killed.

In 1986, a portion of Chinatown and Japantown was listed on the National Register of Historic Places as the "Seattle Chinatown Historic District." That year the Wing Luke Memorial Museum moved to 7th Avenue, a location it would occupy for two decades.

In 1999, the City Council approved the "Chinatown/International District Urban Village Strategic Plan" for the future of the neighborhood. This plan, agreed to by all major organizations in the CID, led to City Ordinance 119297. This ordinance enshrined the three neighborhoods of Chinatown, Japantown, Little Saigon and the Chinatown Historic District into one larger neighborhood with a compromised name. Since then, the often conflicting interests of development, preservation and the conversion of old buildings to low-income housing have clashed as office developments (e.g., Union Station) and market-rate housing developments are overwhelmed by drastic increases in low-income housing stock. In addition, controversy erupted over vacating S. Lane Street as part of a large redevelopment by the private business Uwajimaya. Protesters formed the Save Lane Street organization and insisted as business owners they supported re-development, but opposed vacating a public street for a private business use. After losing a lawsuit filed over the matter, the Save Lane Street group dissolved.

21st century 
Construction on a paifang for the neighborhood began in 2006 and the Historic Chinatown Gate was unveiled on February 9, 2008. It stands at the west end of South King Street. It is 45 feet tall and made from steel and plaster.

The Wing Luke Museum moved to its present location in the East Kong Yick Building in 2008.

As part of projects intended to maintain the identity of the neighborhood, the Seattle Department of Transportation installed bilingual street name signs at its intersections starting in the summer of 2013. The Chinatown and Japantown neighborhoods received them with the initial installation; the Little Saigon neighborhood did not have the signs installed until August 2016. The signs feature a top section with the street's legal English names in white on a green background and a bottom section with white translated text in the neighborhoods' respective native languages on a brown background; traditional Chinese is featured in Chinatown while Japanese is featured in Japantown, with Vietnamese featured in Little Saigon.

On February 28, 2019, police officers arrested five spa owners/operators and conducted a raid on 11 massage parlors, the majority of them on South Jackson Street within the neighborhood, in connection with an investigation into an alleged prostitution and money-laundering scheme that began in January 2015. 26 Chinese women, ranging in age from their late 20s to early 60s, were removed from the parlors; many of them were new arrivals that were not fluent in English. According to police and court documents, many of the women worked 14-hour shifts for six to seven days per week in decrepit conditions.

Rise of homelessness and exodus 
The neighborhood has experienced gentrification since the early 2000s owing to a dramatic increase in overall demand for real estate development in the city; a May 2016 report from the National Coalition of Asian Pacific American Community Development revealed that overall city rents outgrew incomes by 45 percent from 2000 to 2014. As a result, a significant portion of its long-time residents have been displaced from their residences due to their inability to pay the increased rent, subsequently enduring homelessness due to the insufficient amount of affordable housing in the neighborhood. The Nickelsville homeless encampment, established in 2008, moved in September 2014 to a site on South Dearborn Street opposite the onramp to northbound Interstate 5. However, the property owner evicted the encampment in February 2016 after its leader was ousted the year before due to on-site conflict, invalidating the agreement made with the owner; 16 remaining residents were cleared out peacefully on March 11.

In a bid to address the city's worsening homeless crisis, Mayor Ed Murray announced on February 8, 2017, that the city would open a 24/7 homeless shelter similar to the navigation center opened by officials in San Francisco in 2015. After an exhaustive search dating back to the previous June, the city selected the Pearl Warren Building on 12th Avenue South in the Little Saigon area, which was already hosting a traditional men's homeless shelter at the time. The selection was received with mixed to negative reaction from the Little Saigon community; many in the community were surprised by the announcement, claiming that the city did not ask them for input. While members stated that they were understanding of the need to handle the crisis, they held concerns about the potential for crime and sanitation issues. Despite the project's approval by the city, backlash from the community, which included letters sent to him and protests outside Seattle City Hall, prompted Murray to announce on April 24 that he would halt the project until he could devise a plan that would satisfy community members; the center eventually opened on July 12 with 75 beds and within its assigned budget of $2.7 million.

Despite the presence of the navigation shelter, impromptu encampments are still prevalent within the neighborhood; after city officials cleared an encampment of around 20 shelters in a neighboring stairwell on April 22, 2020, many campers migrated one block over to South Weller Street, which was lined with more than 30 shelters. The clearing occurred despite strict guidelines put in place with the COVID-19 pandemic due to the difficulty encountered by the Seattle Police Department in patrolling the stairwell. , there were 15 encampments around the area, with severe public safety issues surrounding their presence cited as a major reason for a mass exodus of businesses from the neighborhood; more than 19 businesses had shuttered operations in the area in that year alone, with Viet Wah's closure on September 30 among the most notable occurrences. In an editorial regarding the Little Saigon section for The Seattle Times, an executive director of a local nonprofit (that also elected to move out) additionally argued that private developers were contributing to the exodus by neglecting to maintain their properties in seeking a market rebound; according to a 2021 economic study of the neighborhood section, it was “rated as having high risk for displacement” owing to rapid residential growth, with around 1,145 new housing units built over the past four years.

Culture 

The neighborhood hosts a Lunar New Year festival near the East Asian Lunar New Year; Dragon Fest, a pan-Asian American festival, during the summer; and a night market in early fall. The nonprofit Friends of Little Saigon hosts an annual Celebrate Little Saigon event that celebrates Vietnamese culture.

Landmarks and institutions 
Certain neighborhood buildings in Seattle's Chinatown incorporate Chinese architectural designs such as balconies on the second or third floors or tile roofs. The neighborhood also has public art installations by artists such as George Tsutakawa and Norie Sato. Artists Meng Huang and Heather Presler installed Chinese dragon sculptures on lampposts along Jackson Street in 2002.

Notable businesses and landmarks include:

 Danny Woo International District Community Garden
 Donnie Chin International Children's Park
 Hing Hay Park
 Historic Chinatown Gate (Seattle)
 Nippon Kan Theater (closed)
 Kobe Terrace
 Panama Hotel
 Uwajimaya
 Wing Luke Museum

In popular culture 
An independent film called The Paper Tigers, a martial arts comedy, was filmed in the Chinatown-International District.

The Chinatown International District has a short appearance in the Naughty Dog's game The Last of Us Part II. During the gameplay players can visit devastated shops, restaurants, and the iconic Chinatown Gate.

See also
Festál at Seattle Center, a series of festivals celebrating the culture and contributions of Seattle's various Asian American and other ethnic communities
 History of Chinese Americans in Seattle
 History of the Japanese in Seattle

References

Further reading
 Bulosan, Carlos. America is in the Heart (1946)
 Chew, Ron, ed. Reflections.
 City Ordinance 119297. www.seattle.gov
 De Barros, Paul. Jackson Street After Hours: The Roots of Jazz in Seattle (1993)
Filipino American National Historical Society. Pamana I. Seattle, Washington. 
Filipino American National Historical Society. Pamana II. Seattle, Washington.
Filipino American National Historical Society. Pamana III. Seattle: 2012.
George, Kathy. "Seattle's Japantown remembered" (Archive). Seattle Post-Intelligencer, Sunday November 21, 2004.
Ho, Chui Mei. Goon Dip.

External links

 
Official website of the Chinatown-International District
Seattle International District description from the National Park Service
International Special Review District from the City of Seattle
Seattle's Asian American Movement, a multimedia collection of resources on the International District Preservation Movement and the Kingdome protests by the Seattle Civil Rights and Labor History Project
International District from Seattle Post-Intelligencer
Guide to the International Special Review District Records 1973-1997 from the Northwest Digital Archives

 
Seattle
Chinese-American culture in Seattle
Historic districts on the National Register of Historic Places in Washington (state)
Japanese-American culture in Seattle
National Register of Historic Places in Seattle
Vietnamese-American culture in Washington (state)